Le Journal illustré, or The illustrated Journal, was a French weekly newspaper which was established in February 1864 and ceased production in 1899. It was modelled on the Penny Illustrated Paper released in 1861 in England. It was illustrated with wood-engravings and large covers topics magazine in eight pages format . A few years later, it was integrated into the media group's Diary.

Designed to compete with L'Illustration which was sold at 75 cents, Le Journal illustré was sold for 10 cents. It disappeared in 1899 when the illustrated supplement of color-illustrated Le Petit Journal, the same group and sold since 1890, supplanted it.

In September 1886, the journal published the centenary interview of the scientist Eugène Chevreul (1786–1889), illustrated by Nadar in a series of photographs reproduced in wood-engraving, which may be the first published history of the sort to contain photographs.

References

 :fr:Le Journal illustré

Bibliography
 

1864 establishments in France
1899 disestablishments in France
Defunct newspapers published in France
Defunct weekly newspapers
Weekly newspapers published in France